Archery Australia (AA) is the governing body for the sport of archery in Australia.

History
The body was founded in Sydney on 17–18 January 1948 as the Archery Association of Australia. In 1993, the body took its current name of Archery Australia.

Structure
The Association was previously governed by a Board composed of eight societies (Archery Society of NSW, Archery ACT, Archery Victoria, Archery Society of Tasmania, Archery South Australia, Archery Society of Western Australia, Archery Society of North Queensland and Archery Society of South Queensland). The day-to-day affairs of the association were managed by an Executive Committee.

In 2001, the Board dramatically changed the constitution. The Archery Board now comprises four elected and up to three appointed Board members. The day-to-day affairs of the association are managed by the Chief Executive Officer, Rick Hastie.

See also

Clubs
 Bowmen of Melville

References

External links
 
 

Australia
Archery in Australia
Sports governing bodies in Australia
1948 establishments in Australia
Sports organizations established in 1948